Chelsea Lynn Makela (born January 16, Brentwood, California), better known as Chelsea Makela, is an American actress, writer and designer. Makela has been performing since she was in middle school; one of her biggest accomplishments at this time, was singing at Carnegie Hall in New York City at the age of 14. Makela's first movie role was the lead role Tracy Transfat in Dance Flick, a film released by Paramount Pictures in 2009.  She has also appeared in several television shows and films since then.

References

 Kidzworld (USA) February 7, 2012, pg. 1, by: Marisa, "Chelsea Makela Q&A"
 Girl's Life (USA) May 2009, pg. 2, by: Sara Cummings, "Getting To Know Chelsea Makela"
 Inspire (USA) May 2009, pg. 2, "Chelsea Makela"
 Hometown Hollywood (USA) November 19, 2008, by: CSS, "'Dance Flick' Trailer"
 Brentwood Press (USA) November 28, 2008, Vol. 10, Iss. 48, pg. 3A, by: Samie Hartley, "From Brentwood to Hollywood"
 CanMag (USA) November 14, 2008, by: Ryan Parsons, "Dance Flick Trailer"
 Media Blvd (USA) November 11, 2008, by: Kenn and Angela Gold, "Chelsea Makela: A Newcomer Making Her Mark"
 Yikes (USA) June 2009, pg. 36, "Celebrity Yikes Moments"
 Los Angeles Times: http://articles.latimes.com/2009/may/22/entertainment/et-dance22
 Entertainment Weekly: http://www.ew.com/ew/article/0,,20280665,00.html
First Post Weekly: http://www.firstpost.com/topic/event/full-figured-fashion-week-chelsea-makela-of-make-la-fashion-week-1-update-video-1TVMsJOhJb4-83279-1.html
Funny Humor: http://www.funnyhumorclips.net/yt/aloha-paige-hurd-show-promo-starring-paige-hurd-chelsea-makela/hp-S0bgMbF8.html
Young Actors Camp: http://www.youngactorstheatrecamp.org/Success_Stories.html
Teen Scene: https://web.archive.org/web/20101130131814/http://teenscenemag.com/movies/upcoming/chelsea-makela-interview.html
The Guardian UK: www.guardian.co.uk/film/movie/128193/dance-flick
Star Scoop: www.thestarscoop.com/2009/11/
Starpulse: www.starpulse.com/events/11383/0/13/Selena+Gomez.../1/
Variety: www.variety.com/review/VE1117940331?refcatid=31...true

External links

 

American film actresses
American television actresses
Living people
People from Brentwood, California
Year of birth missing (living people)
21st-century American women